

Country

Australia
Joe Hockey (Family Name "Hokeidonian") - Member of Federal Parliament Shadow Treasurer 
Gladys Berejiklian- Member of Parliament, Premier of NSW Ms Gladys BEREJIKLIAN, BA, DIntS, MCom MP - NSW Parliament </ref>
Clr Sarkis Yedelian- Deputy Mayor of Ryde, New South Wales.
Clr. Artin Etmekdjian. JP - Mayor (2010-2012) - City of Ryde, New South Wales

Canada
Sarkis Assadourian – Former Liberal MP 1993-2004.
Harout Chitilian, Chairman of the City Council of Montreal

Cyprus
Marios Garoyian - President of Cypriot Parliament

Egypt 
Nubar Pasha, the first Prime Minister of Egypt

France
Édouard Balladur - Former Prime Minister of France
Patrick Devedjian - French Minister 
Jean Pierre Asvazadourian - French Ambassador to Argentina

Lebanon
Émile Lahoud - Former President of Lebanon
Karim Pakradouni – Ex-Minister, former President of Phalange (Kataeb) Party
Hagop Pakradounian – Member of Parliament

Mexico
Arturo Sarukhán - Mexican ambassador to the US

New Zealand
Sian Elias - Chief Justice of New Zealand
Doug Zohrab- New Zealand's Ambassador to the UN, Germany, Switzerland, and Austria

Romania
Varujan Vosganian-Finance minister of Romania

Russia
Sergey Lavrov- Minister of Foreign Affairs
Margarita Simonyan- Editor-in-Chief of RT (Russia Today)
Andranik Migranyan- former director of the Institute for Democracy and Cooperation, New York
Gennadiy Melikyan- former First Deputy Chairman of  Central Bank of Russia
Sergey Grigorov- former Head of  Federal Agency of Export Control
Sergey Oganesyan- former Head of  Federal Energy Agency
Artur Chilingarov- deputy (1993-2011 and since 2016) and Deputy Chairman (2000–11) of  State Duma and former member of  Federation Council of Russia (2011–14)
Vladimir Jabbarov-  member of  Federation Council of Russia
Aleksandr Ter Avanesov-  former member of  Federation Council of Russia (2006-2015)
Ohanes Oganyan- former deputy of State Duma (2011–16) and former member of  Federation Council of Russia (2001–11)
Levon Chakmakhcyan- former member of  Federation Council of Russia
Semyen Bagdasarov- former deputy of State Duma
Ashot Yegiazaryan- former deputy of  State Duma
Arkadiy Sarkisyan- former deputy of  State Duma
Stepan Shorshorov- former deputy of State Duma
Igor Khankoev- former deputy of State Duma
Ashot Sarkisyan- former deputy of  State Duma

Palestinian National Authority
Manuel Hassassian- Palestinian ambassador to the United Kingdom

Sweden
Esabelle Dingizian - Member of Riksdag
Murad Artin - Member of Riksdag

Turkey
Garo Paylan - Member of Parliament of Turkey

Ukraine
Karekin Arutyunov - Member People's Deputy of Ukraine, member of Yulia Tymoshenko Bloc, member of "Bat'kivshchina" party.
Arsen Avakov- Interior minister of Ukraine

United Kingdom
Ara Darzi, Baron Darzi of Denham - Parliamentary Under-Secretary of State for Health (2007-2009)

United States

Uruguay
Liliam Kechichián, Minister of Tourism

See also
List of Armenians

References 

 Armenian politics

People of Armenian descent
Lists of Armenian people